Kazakhstan competed at the 2004 Summer Olympics in Athens, Greece, from 13 to 29 August 2004. This was the nation's third appearance at the Summer Olympics in the post-Soviet era.

National Olympic Committee of the Republic of Kazakhstan sent a total of 114 athletes to the Games, 71 men and 43 women, to compete in 17 sports. The nation's team size was roughly smaller by 16 athletes from Sydney, and had the third largest share of men in its Summer Olympic history. Water polo was the only team-based sport in which Kazakhstan had its representation in these Olympic games. Among the sports played by the athletes, Kazakhstan marked its official Olympic debut in rhythmic gymnastics.

Notable Kazakh athletes featured returning Olympic medalists Alexander Vinokourov in road cycling and Islam Bairamukov in men's freestyle wrestling. Grigoriy Yegorov made his official comeback for his second Olympic bid, since he won the bronze medal in the men's pole vault at the 1988 Summer Olympics in Seoul, representing the Soviet Union. Pistol shooter Galina Belyayeva was the oldest and most accomplished member of the team at age 55. Meanwhile, backstroke swimmer Anastassiya Prilepa set a historic milestone for the Kazakh team as the youngest ever athlete, aged 14, to compete at the Olympics.

Kazakhstan left Athens with a total of eight Olympic medals (one gold, four silver, and three bronze), finishing fortieth in the overall medal count. This was also the nation's poorest Olympic performance in history since the breakup of the Soviet Union, collecting only a single gold medal from welterweight boxer Bakhtiyar Artayev. Three of these medals were awarded each to the athletes in boxing and wrestling, including Artayev's illustrious gold, while Dmitriy Karpov added a second Olympic medal for Kazakhstan in track and field by claiming the bronze in men's decathlon.

Weightlifter Sergey Filimonov originally captured a bronze in the men's 77 kg class. On February 12, 2013, the International Olympic Committee stripped Russia's Oleg Perepetchenov of his 2004 Olympic medal after both probes were retested and showed traces of anabolic steroids, upgrading Filimonov's medal to silver.

Medalists

Archery 

Two Kazakh archers qualified each for the men's and women's individual archery.

Athletics 

Kazakh athletes have so far achieved qualifying standards in the following athletics events (up to a maximum of 3 athletes in each event at the 'A' Standard, and 1 at the 'B' Standard).

Men
Track & road events

Field events

Combined events – Decathlon

Women
Track & road events

Field events

Combined events – Heptathlon

Boxing 

Kazakhstan sent eight boxers to the 2004 Olympics.  Each of them won at least one bout, a feat that not even Cuba accomplished.  Three of the Kazakhstani boxers won medals, one each of gold, silver, and bronze.  This put Kazakhstan in a tie with Thailand for third place in the boxing medals count, behind only Cuba and Russia.  Russia was a constant annoyance for the Kazakhs, as they lost four of the five matches they boxed against Russians.  In contrast, Bakhtiyar Artayev won the only match Kazakhstan had against the almost-invincible Cubans. Two boxers were defeated in the round of 16.  Three more fell in the quarterfinals, just missing medals.  The combined record of the eight boxers was 17-7.

Canoeing

Sprint
Men

Qualification Legend: Q = Qualify to final; q = Qualify to semifinal

Cycling

Road

Track
Pursuit

Omnium

Gymnastics

Artistic
Men

Rhythmic

Judo

Eight Kazakh judoka (five men and three women) qualified for the 2004 Summer Olympics.

Men

Women

Modern pentathlon

Two Kazakh athletes qualified to compete in the modern pentathlon event through the Asian Modern Pentathlon Championships.

Shooting 

Four Kazakh shooters qualified to compete in the following events:

Men

Women

Swimming 

Kazakh swimmers earned qualifying standards in the following events (up to a maximum of 2 swimmers in each event at the A-standard time, and 1 at the B-standard time):

Men

Women

Synchronized swimming 

Two Kazakh synchronized swimmers qualified a spot in the women's duet.

Taekwondo

Kazakhstan has sent one taekwondo jin to compete.

Triathlon

Four Kazakh triathletes qualified for the following events.

Water polo

Men's tournament

Roster

Group play

9th-12th Place Semifinal

11th-12th Place Final

Women's tournament

Roster

Group play

7th-8th Place Final

Weightlifting 

Three Kazakh weightlifters qualified for the following events:

Wrestling 

Kazakh wrestlers qualified to compete in all events except the men's freestyle 60 kg class and the women's freestyle wrestling.

Men's freestyle

Men's Greco-Roman

See also
 Kazakhstan at the 2002 Asian Games
 Kazakhstan at the 2004 Summer Paralympics

References

External links
Official Report of the XXVIII Olympiad
Kazakhstan National Olympic Committee 

Nations at the 2004 Summer Olympics
2004
Summer Olympics